Echis hughesi, known as the Hughes' carpet viper, Somali carpet viper, and Hughes' saw-scaled viper, is a species of venomous snake in the subfamily Viperinae of the family Viperidae. The species is endemic to Somalia. There are no subspecies which are currently recognized as being valid.

Etymology
The specific name, hughesi, is in honor of British herpetologist Barry Hughes.

Description
The head scalation is similar to that of E. pyramidum. Midbody, there are 24–25 dorsal scale rows. The ventrals number 144–149, and the subcaudals number 28–30. The color pattern varies, but generally consists of a series of pale, oblique, dorsal blotches set against a darker ground color.

Geographic range
Echis hughesi is found only in northern Somalia, in northern Migiurtinia, near Meledin.

The type locality is listed as "Somalia, 10°02' [N lat.], 49° [E long.]".

References

Further reading
Cherlin VA (1990). ["A taxonomic revision of the snake genus Echis (Viperidae). II. An analysis of taxonomy and description of new forms"]. [Proc. Zool. Inst. Leningrad ] 207: 193-223. (Echis hughesi, new species). (in Russian).
Golay P, Smith HM, Broadley DG, Dixon JR, McCarthy CJ, Rage J-C, Schätti B, Toriba M (1993). Endoglyphs and Other Major Venomous Snakes of the World. A Checklist. Geneva: Azemiops. 478 pp.

External links

Viperinae
Snakes of Africa
Reptiles of Somalia
Endemic fauna of Somalia
Reptiles described in 1990